This is a list of films which placed number-one at the South Korean box office during 2014.

Highest-grossing films

References

 Lists of South Korean films
 

South Korea
2014
Box